Elian Franco Parrino (born 3 September 1988) is an Argentinian footballer who currently plays as a defender for Spanish club CD Benicarló.

Born in Rosario, he started his career with Estudiantes de La Plata and holds an Italian passport which permits him to play within the European Union.

Club career

Sheffield United
Having started his career in his homeland of Argentina with Estudiantes de La Plata and was spotted by Sheffield United when he appeared in a pre-season friendly against them in the summer of 2010. He subsequently signed for the Blades on a year-long loan following a brief trial spell. Despite this move he barely even made the substitutes bench during the first half of the season, with manager Gary Speed claiming he wasn't ready for English football.

Following the departure of Speed the arrival of new Blades manager Micky Adams helped to re-ignite Parrino's season, immediately handing him a place in the starting line up and installing him as first choice at right-back. Unfortunately, his spell in the first team came to an end when he injured his metatarsal in February, an injury which would put him out of action for the remainder of the campaign, although in May 2011, Parrino expressed his desire to stay at Bramall Lane after his loan contract expired. After returning to Argentina to recover from his injuries, in late July it was speculated that Parrino would return to the Blades and that Estudiantes had given permission for the defender to speak about a return to England. After impressing manager Danny Wilson, he signed a new one-year deal with the Blades in mid-August. After failing to make the breakthrough into the first team the following season however, United agreed to end Parrino's deal and allow him to leave the club during the January transfer window. In February of that year Lincoln City suggested they had tried to sign Parrino before the transfer window closed but couldn't gain international clearance in time, with boss David Holdsworth suggesting they would try and resurrect the deal in the summer. Parino joined Lokomotiv Plovdiv in the A PFG in the summer of 2014.

Career statistics

References

External links
 
 

1988 births
Living people
Argentine footballers
Argentine expatriate footballers
Association football defenders
Estudiantes de La Plata footballers
Sheffield United F.C. players
Grupo Universitario de Tandil players
Juventud Antoniana footballers
Instituto footballers
Club Atlético Douglas Haig players
PFC Lokomotiv Plovdiv players
Coquimbo Unido footballers
KF Shkëndija players
English Football League players
First Professional Football League (Bulgaria) players
Torneo Federal A players
Primera Nacional players
Serie D players
Primera B de Chile players
Macedonian First Football League players
Argentine people of Italian descent
Footballers from Rosario, Santa Fe
Expatriate footballers in England
Expatriate footballers in North Macedonia
Expatriate footballers in Chile
Expatriate footballers in Bulgaria
Expatriate footballers in Italy
Expatriate footballers in Spain
Argentine expatriate sportspeople in England
Argentine expatriate sportspeople in North Macedonia
Argentine expatriate sportspeople in Chile
Argentine expatriate sportspeople in Bulgaria
Argentine expatriate sportspeople in Italy
Argentine expatriate sportspeople in Spain